This is a list of the all-time best regular season winning percentages in the NBA.

Above .756

See also
NBA regular season records
List of National Basketball Association longest winning streaks

Notes
 Formula for average point differential: 
 The Boston Celtics appear ten times on the list, followed by the Los Angeles Lakers with eight appearances and the Chicago Bulls with six.
 Phil Jackson appears six times on the list; Pat Riley appears five times and Gregg Popovich four.
 Jackson (coaching the Lakers and the Chicago Bulls) and Red Auerbach (coaching the Celtics and the Washington Capitols) are the only coaches to appear leading different teams.

References

National Basketball Association lists